Sir Edward Victor Appleton  (6 September 1892 – 21 April 1965) was an English physicist, Nobel Prize winner (1947) and pioneer in radiophysics. He studied, and was also employed as a lab technician, at Bradford College from 1909 to 1911.

He won the Nobel Prize in Physics in 1947 for his seminal work proving the existence of the ionosphere during experiments carried out in 1924.

Biography 

Appleton was born in Bradford, West Riding of Yorkshire, the son of Peter Appleton, a warehouseman, and Mary Wilcock, and was educated at Hanson Grammar School.

In 1911, aged 18, he was awarded a scholarship to attend St John's College, Cambridge, where he graduated with First Class Honours in Natural Science with Physics in 1913. He was also a member of Isaac Newton University Lodge. In 1915, he married his first wife, Jessie Appleton (formerly Longson), with whom he had two kids. He remarried three years after her death to Helen Lennie (m. 1965).

During the First World War he joined the West Riding Regiment, and later transferred to the Royal Engineers. After returning from active service in the First World War, Appleton became assistant demonstrator in experimental physics at the Cavendish Laboratory in 1920. In 1922 he was initiated into Freemasonry. He was professor of physics at King's College London (1924–1936) and professor of natural philosophy at the University of Cambridge (1936–1939). From 1939 to 1949 he was secretary of the Department of Scientific and Industrial Research. Knighted in 1941, he received the 1947 Nobel Prize in Physics for his contributions to the knowledge of the ionosphere, which led to the development of radar.

From 1949 until his death in 1965, Appleton was Principal and Vice-Chancellor of the University of Edinburgh. In 1956, the BBC invited him to deliver the annual Reith Lectures. Across a series of six radio broadcasts, titled Science and the Nation, he explored the many facets of scientific activity in Britain at the time.

Sir Edward died on 21 April 1965 at Edinburgh and is buried in Edinburgh's Morningside Cemetery with his wife Helen Lennie (d. 1983). The grave lies towards the extreme western side near the new housing to the north-west.

Works 
Appleton had observed that the strength of the radio signal from a transmitter on a frequency such as the medium wave band and over a path of a hundred miles or so was constant during the day but that it varied during the night. This led him to believe that it was possible that two radio signals were being received. One was travelling along the ground, and another was reflected by a layer in the upper atmosphere. The fading or variation in strength of the overall radio signal received resulted from the interference pattern of the two signals.

The existence of a reflecting atmospheric layer was not in itself a completely new idea. Balfour Stewart had suggested the idea in the late 19th century to explain rhythmic changes in the earth's magnetic field. More recently, in 1902, Oliver Heaviside and Arthur E. Kennelly had suggested such an electromagnetic-reflecting stratum, now called the Kennelly–Heaviside layer, may explain the success Marconi had in transmitting his signals across the Atlantic. Calculations had shown that natural bending of the radio waves was not sufficient to stop them from simply "shooting off" into empty space before they reached the receiver.

Appleton thought the best place to look for evidence of the ionosphere was in the variations he believed it was causing around sunset in radio signal receptions. It was sensible to suggest these variations were due to the interference of two waves but an extra step to show that the second wave causing the interference (the first being the ground wave) was coming down from the ionosphere. The experiment he designed had two methods to show ionospheric influence and both allowed the height of the lower boundary of reflection (thus the lower boundary of the reflecting layer) to be determined. The first method was called frequency modulation and the second was to calculate the angle of arrival of the reflected signal at the receiving aerial.

The frequency modulation method exploits the fact that there is a path difference between the ground wave and the reflected wave, meaning they travel different distances from sender to receiver.

Let the distance AC travelled by the ground wave be h and the distance ABC travelled by the reflected wave h'. The path difference is:

The wavelength of the transmitted signal is λ. The number of wavelengths difference between the paths h and h' is:

If N is an integer number, then constructive interference will occur, this means a maximum signal will be achieved at the receiving end. If N is an odd integer number of half wavelengths, then destructive interference will occur and a minimum signal will be received. Let us assume we are receiving a maximum signal for a given wavelength λ. If we start to change λ, this is the process called frequency modulation, N will no longer be a whole number and destructive interference will start to occur, meaning the signal will start to fade.  Now we keep changing λ until a maximum signal is once again received. The means that for our new value λ', our new value N' is also an integer number. If we have lengthened λ then we know that N' is one less than N. Thus:

Rearranging for D gives:

As we know λ and λ', we can calculate D. Using the approximation that ABC is an isosceles triangle, we can use our value of D to calculate the height of the reflecting layer. This method is a slightly simplified version of the method used by Appleton and his colleagues to work out a first value for the height of the ionosphere in 1924. In their experiment, they used the BBC broadcasting station in Bournemouth to vary the wavelengths of its emissions after the evening programmes had finished. They installed a receiving station in Oxford to monitor the interference effects. The receiving station had to be in Oxford as there was no suitable emitter at the right distance of about 62 miles (100 km) from Cambridge in those days.

This frequency modulation method revealed that the point from which waves were being reflected was approximately 56 miles (90 km). However, it did not establish that the waves were reflected from above, indeed they may have been coming from hills somewhere between Oxford and Bournemouth. The second method, which involved finding the angle of incidence of the reflected waves at the receiver, showed for sure that they were coming from above. Triangulations from this angle gave results for the height of reflection compatible with the frequency modulation method. We will not go into this method in detail because it involves fairly complex calculations using Maxwell's electromagnetic theory.

Far from being conclusive, the success of the Oxford-Bournemouth experiment revealed a vast new field of study to be explored. It showed that there was indeed a reflecting layer high above the earth but it also posed many new questions. What was the constitution of this layer, how did it reflect the waves, was it the same all over the earth, why did its effects change so dramatically between day and night, did it change throughout the year? Appleton would spend the rest of his life answering these questions. He developed a magneto-ionic theory based on the previous work of Lorentz and Maxwell to model the workings of this part of the atmosphere. Using this theory and further experiments, he showed that the so-called Kennelly–Heaviside layer was heavily ionised and thus conducting. This led to the term ionosphere. He showed free electrons to be the ionising agents. He discovered that the layer could be penetrated by waves above a certain frequency and that this critical frequency could be used to calculate the electron density in the layer. However these penetrating waves would also be reflected back, but from a much higher layer. This showed the ionosphere had a much more complex structure than first anticipated.   The lower level was labelled E – Layer, reflected longer wavelengths and was found to be at approximately 78 miles (125 km). The high level, which had much higher electron density, was labelled F – Layer and could reflect much shorter wavelengths that penetrated the lower layer. It is situated 186 – 248 miles (300 – 400 km) above the earth's surface. It is this which is often referred to as the Appleton Layer as is responsible for enabling most long range short wave telecommunication.

The magneto-ionic theory also allowed Appleton to explain the origin of the mysterious fadings heard on the radio around sunset. During the day, the light from the sun causes the molecules in the air to become ionised even at fairly low altitudes. At these low altitudes, the density of the air is great and thus the electron density of ionised air is very large. Due to this heavy ionisation, there is strong absorption of electromagnetic waves caused by 'electron friction'. Thus in transmissions over any distance, there will be no reflections as any waves apart from the one at ground level will be absorbed rather than reflected. However, when the sun sets, the molecules slowly start to recombine with their electrons and the free electron density levels drop. This means absorption rates diminish and waves can be reflected with sufficient strengths to be noticed, leading to the interference phenomena we have mentioned. For these interference patterns to occur though, there must not simply be the presence of a reflected wave but a change in the reflected wave.  Otherwise the interference is constant and fadings would not be heard. The received signal would simply be louder or softer than during the day. This suggests the height at which reflection happens must slowly change as the sun sets. Appleton found in fact that it increased as the sun set and then decreased as the sun rose until the reflected wave was too weak to record. This variation is compatible with the theory that ionisation is due to the sun's influence. At sunset, the intensity of the sun's radiation will be much less at the surface of the earth than it is high up in the atmosphere. This means ionic recombination will progress slowly from lower altitudes to higher ones and therefore the height at which waves are reflected slowly increases as the sun sets.

The basic idea behind Appleton's work is so simple that it is hard to understand at first how he devoted almost all of his scientific career to its study. However, in the last couple of paragraphs some of the complexities of the subject have been introduced. Like many other fields, it is one that grows in intricacy the more it is studied. By the end of his life, ionospheric observatories had been set up all over the world to provide a global map of the reflecting layers. Links were found to the 11-year sunspot cycle and the aurora borealis, the magnetic storms that occur in high latitudes. This became particularly relevant during the Second World War when the storms would lead to radio blackouts. Thanks to Appleton's research, the periods when these would occur could be predicted and communication could be switched to wavelengths that would be least affected. Radar, another crucial wartime innovation, was one that came about thanks to Appleton's work. On a very general level, his research consisted in determining the distance of reflecting objects from radio signal transmitters. This is exactly the idea of radar and the flashing dots that appear on the screen (a cathode ray tube) scanned by the circulating 'searcher' bar. This system was developed partly by Appleton as a new method, called the pulse method, to make ionospheric measurements. It was later adapted by Robert Watson-Watt to detect aeroplanes. Nowadays, ionospheric data is important when communications with satellites are considered. The correct frequencies for these signals must be selected so that they actually reach the satellites without being reflected or deviated before.

In 1974 the Radio and Space Research Station was renamed the Appleton Laboratory in honour of the man who had done so much to establish the UK as a leading force in ionospheric research, and had been involved with the station first as a researcher and then as secretary of its parent body, the Department of Scientific and Industrial Research.

Honours and awards 
Appleton was awarded the following:
 Fellow of the Royal Society (1927)
 Foreign Honorary Member of the American Academy of Arts and Sciences (1936)
 Nobel Prize in Physics (1947)
 Faraday Medal
 Hughes Medal
 Royal Medal
 Chree Medal
In addition the following are named in his honour:
 Rutherford Appleton Laboratory
 Appleton Medal and Prize
 Appleton Suite at Bradford Register Offices
 Appleton Tower at the University of Edinburgh
 Appleton Science Building at Bradford College
 Appleton Academy, a school in the Wyke area of the City of Bradford
 Appleton crater on the Moon is named in his honour.
 Appleton Layer, which is the higher atmospheric ionised layer above the E-layer
 Annual Appleton Lecture at the Institution of Engineering and Technology

Artistic recognition 
Appleton's portrait, by William Hutchison hangs in Old College, University of Edinburgh.

See also 
Journal of Atmospheric and Terrestrial Physics, founded by Appleton

References 

 
 IET Appleton lectures
  with the Nobel Lecture, 12 December 1947 The Ionosphere (Citation: Nobel Prize in Physics: 1947, "for his investigations of the physics of the upper atmosphere especially for the discovery of the so-called Appleton layer." 
 "Sir Edward Victor Appleton (1892–1965): Appleton was an English physicist and Nobel prize winner who discovered the ionosphere."  Historic Figures, bbc.co.uk.  Accessed 21 October 2007.  (Photograph of Appleton c. 1935 ©). [Provides link to Nobel Foundation account, listed above.]
 Science and the Nation The BBC Reith Lectures, 1956, by Edward Appleton

External links

 
Memoirs of Sir Edward Victor Appleton, 1920 – 1966
 Sir Edward Appleton; The Discovery of the Properties of the Ionosphere

1892 births
1965 deaths
20th-century British physicists
Academics of King's College London
Fellows of King's College London
Academics of the University of London
Alumni of St John's College, Cambridge
Alumni of the University of Edinburgh
Atmospheric physicists
English physicists
Fellows of the Royal Society
IEEE Medal of Honor recipients
Knights Grand Cross of the Order of the British Empire
Nobel laureates in Physics
Scientists from Bradford
Principals of the University of Edinburgh
Royal Medal winners
Knights Commander of the Order of the Bath
Recipients of the King Haakon VII Freedom Cross
Honorary Fellows of the Royal Society of Edinburgh
Fellows of the American Academy of Arts and Sciences
Foreign Fellows of the Indian National Science Academy
English Nobel laureates
Jacksonian Professors of Natural Philosophy
Presidents of the British Science Association
People associated with the nuclear weapons programme of the United Kingdom
Scientists of the National Physical Laboratory (United Kingdom)
Members of the German Academy of Sciences at Berlin
English Freemasons
Members of Isaac Newton University Lodge
Military personnel from Bradford
British Army personnel of World War I
Royal Engineers soldiers
Duke of Wellington's Regiment soldiers
Burials in Scotland